Spanish Jamaicans are Jamaican citizens of Spanish origin or descent.

Spanish Colonization of Santiago (Jamaica)
The Spaniards first settled on that part of the northern coast of Jamaica which is now known as the parish of St. Ann. There they built a town called Sevilla Nueva, or New Seville. Afterwards they moved to the southern part of the island and built the town of St. Jago de la Vega, which is still called Spanish Town. The island was given to the Columbus family as a personal estate in 1540, but they did nothing to develop it. The Spanish colony in Jamaica was never a very large or a very flourishing one.

Spanish cities and towns in Jamaica
The reminders of this historical period are the names of places all over the island, Such as Ocho Rios, Rio Bueno, Santa Cruz, Rio Cobre, Port Antonio and most importantly Spanish Town, formerly known as St. Jago de la Vega, the capital under the Spanish.

Notable people

 Frank Silvera, Jamaican American actor and director
 Gail Vaz-Oxlade, Jamaican-Canadian financial writer and television personality
 Ken Khouri, Jamaican record producer
 Lady Colin Campbell, Jamaican radio host, author and socialite
 Wilfred Adolphus Domingo, Journalist

See also
 Colony of Santiago (Jamaica)

References

Ethnic groups in Jamaica
European Jamaican
European diaspora in North America
Spanish Caribbean
Jamaica